Death Before Dishonor VI was the sixth Death Before Dishonor professional wrestling event produced by Ring of Honor (ROH), which took place on August 2, 2008, at the Hammerstein Ballroom in New York City, New York.

Storylines
Death Before Dishonor VI featured professional wrestling matches, involving different wrestlers from pre-existing scripted feuds, plots, and storylines that played out on ROH's television programs. Wrestlers portrayed villains or heroes as they followed a series of events that built tension and culminated in a wrestling match or series of matches.

Results

See also
2008 in professional wrestling

References

External links
Ring of Honor's official website

2008 in professional wrestling
Events in New York City
6
2008 in New York City
Professional wrestling in New York City
August 2008 events in the United States